Korhan is a masculine Turkish given name.

Given name
 Korhan Abay (born 1954), Turkish actor
 Korhan Basaran, Turkish dancer
 Korhan Öztürk (born 1982), Turkish footballer
Muharrem Korhan Yamaç (born 1972), Turkish disabled sport shooter
 Korhan Erel (born 1973), Turkish musician, artist, composer

Turkish masculine given names